Andreas Kränzlin (date of birth unknown; date of death unknown) was a German footballer who played two seasons for FC Basel as midfielder at the beginning of the 1940s.

Kränzlin joined Basel's first team in their 1939–40 season under first team co-managers Walter Dietrich and Max Galler. After appearing in three test matches, he played his domestic league debut for the club in the home game at the Landhof on 3 December 1939 as Basel won 5–0 against Solothurn.

In his time with Basel Kränzlin played a total of 28 games for the club without scoring a goal. 16 of these games were in the 1 Liga, three in the Swiss Cup and nine were friendly games.

References

Sources
 Rotblau: Jahrbuch Saison 2017/2018. Publisher: FC Basel Marketing AG. 
 Die ersten 125 Jahre. Publisher: Josef Zindel im Friedrich Reinhardt Verlag, Basel. 
 Verein "Basler Fussballarchiv" Homepage
(NB: Despite all efforts, the editors of these books and the authors in "Basler Fussballarchiv" have failed to be able to identify all the players, their date and place of birth or date and place of death, who played in the games during the early years of FC Basel)

FC Basel players
German footballers
Association football midfielders